The Congress of People for Progress is a political party in Benin. 
At the last legislative elections in Benin, on March 30, 2003, the party was a member of the Presidential Movement, the alliance of supporters of Mathieu Kérékou, who had won the 2001 presidential elections.  It took part in a combined list of the Movement for Development by Culture, the Party of Salvation and the Congress of People for Progress, that won 2 of the 83 available seats.

Political parties in Benin
Political parties with year of establishment missing